Mukhedis a municipal council in Nanded district in the Indian state of Maharashtra.

History
The historical name of this city was 'Mohanavati Nagar'.  There is a fable about this name change.  There was strong belief among native peoples that this city was "enchanted". Once any person visited this city, they would be enchanted, and, as result, not be able to easily leave. The name Mohanavati means bewitch. The current name of the city is Mukhed.

Mukhed has a temple dedicated to Veerbhadra, a son of Shiva. Veerbhadra is the Gram Daivat (town/village deity). Another temple is that of Shri Dashratheshwar, built in the 12th century during the reign of Vikramaditya Chalukya.

The Capital of ''Mukhedtalukas Capital is 'beli budruk' ",.

Demographics
 India census, Mukhed had a population of 27,650.

Transport
Mukhed is about 75 km from Nanded this distance is via Narsi - Naigoan-kahala to Nanded city, travel time to Mukhed from Nanded takes about 90 minute by public transport, and there is no train service.Nowadays one new highway is under construction ,which is going through Kautha- usman Nagar - Nanded.

Mukhed Taluka
Total population of Mukhed Taluka is more than 250,000 in 46,556 Houses, Spread across total 253 villages and 129 panchayats. While Mukhed town has population more than 27,000.

See also
 Jamb, one of major village in Mukhed taluka

References

External links
 Mukhed News

Cities and towns in Nanded district
Talukas in Maharashtra
Places in the Ramayana